Anisochaeta is a genus of flowering plants in the daisy family (Asteraceae).

There is only one known species, Anisochaeta mikanioides, endemic to the Province of KwaZulu-Natal in South Africa.

References

Athroismeae
Endemic flora of South Africa
Taxa named by Augustin Pyramus de Candolle